Daniel Bruce Goforth is a former Democratic member of the North Carolina General Assembly who represented the state's one hundred fifteenth House district, including constituents in Buncombe County.  A contractor from Asheville, North Carolina, Goforth served almost four complete terms in the state House. He resigned in 2010 before the end of his fourth term, after losing the Democratic nomination for a fifth term to Patsy Keever.

In 2011, he joined the Republican Party.

Environment
Environment North Carolina, a statewide 501 (c)3 non-profit, ranked him as the worst environmental legislator in the state in 2007.

References

Members of the North Carolina House of Representatives
Politicians from Asheville, North Carolina
Year of birth missing (living people)
Living people
21st-century American politicians